Zhengzhou No.8 Middle School (Chinese: 郑州市 第八 中学 Zhèng-zhōu-shì dì-bā zhōng-xué) is a junior high school in Zhengzhou, Henan, China. It was established in July 1952 and is located at Jingwu Road, Jinshui District.

The middle school became one of the Key Middle Schools of Henan Province. Its practice base received a provincial award in 2008.

References

External links
Official website of Zhengzhou No.8 Middle School (archive)

Education in Zhengzhou
High schools in Henan
Educational institutions established in 1952
1952 establishments in China
Junior secondary schools in China